Mundari Karya (born 1 October 1959) is an  Indonesian football manager who formerly managed his hometown's team PSPS Pekanbaru.

He is known for developing talent in young footballers, such as the Malian footballer Makan Konate who was brought by Mundari to Indonesia at a young age. 

Since 2020, Mundari has been the team manager of Liga 1 club PS Barito Putera.

References 

1959 births
Living people
Indonesian football managers